The Rhoda Nohlechek House in Wenden, Arizona was built in 1911.  It was listed on the National Register of Historic Places in 1996.

Its original  wood portion was built in 1911 by gold prospector George Bray.  Bray was murdered shortly after establishing a rich gold deposit claim.  Rhoda Nohlechek acquired the maining claim and also Bray's house.

The house is located at the northwestern corner of the junction of 2nd St. and Date Ave.

The listing included a second contributing building, a barn built around 1914, and it included a contributing structure, a  smokehouse also built around 1914.

References

National Register of Historic Places in La Paz County, Arizona
Houses completed in 1911